The second Parkes ministry was the sixteenth ministry of the Colony of New South Wales, and was led by Sir Henry Parkes. It was the second of five occasions that Parkes was Leader of the Government.

Having served in the New South Wales Legislative Council between 1854 and 1856, Parkes was elected in the first free elections for the New South Wales Legislative Assembly held in 1856, however resigned from Parliament later that year. He served in the Assembly on several occasions, between 1858 and 1870, being forced to resign on at least on occasion due to his personal insolvency. He came to power as Premier on the first occasion in 1872, serving as Premier for a period of three years. However, Parkes lost the confidence of the Assembly following Governor Robinson's decision to release of the bushranger Frank Gardiner led to the defeat of the ministry in 1875.

John Robertson served as Leader of the Government between 1875 and 1877, before Robertson's supply bill was defeated in the Assembly and the Governor had refused to dissolve the parliament without supply. Parkes formed his second ministry in a challenging environment where both Parkes and Robertson shared equal representation in the Legislative Assembly and business was sometimes at a standstill.

The title of Premier was widely used to refer to the Leader of Government, but not enshrined in formal use until 1920.

There was no party system in New South Wales politics until 1887. Under the constitution, ministers were required to resign to re-contest their seats in a by-election when appointed. Such ministerial by-elections were usually uncontested and on this occasion a poll was required for The Hawkesbury (William Piddington) and he was comfortably re-elected. The six other ministers, Henry Parkes (East Sydney), Francis Suttor (Bathurst), Richard Driver (Windsor), James Hoskins (The Tumut), William Windeyer (University of Sydney) and George Lloyd (Newcastle), were re-elected unopposed.

This ministry covers the period from 22 March 1877 until 16 August 1877, when Parkes was in turn unable to obtain supply and resigned when Robertson indicated that he was able to form a government.

Composition of ministry

Ministers are members of the Legislative Assembly unless otherwise noted.

See also

References

 

New South Wales ministries
1877 establishments in Australia
1877 disestablishments in Australia